Tilpi is a village and an archaeological site within the jurisdiction of the Jaynagar police station in the Jaynagar I CD block in the Baruipur subdivision of the South 24 Parganas district in the Indian state of West Bengal.

History
According to the District Census Handbook, this archeological site is located beside the Piyali river. “Here, beside different artefacts, remains of some ancient structures have also been discovered. Sunga style Terracotta artefacts, earthen wares with ornate design, toy carts with animals like elephant, ram, god-like figurines etc. have been excavated. The most notable item of Tilpi is a mould of elephant decorated with flower at the end of the trunk.” It was excavated in 2005–07.

According to Sharmi Chakraborty, Centre for archaeological Studies and Training, Eastern India, the site was excavated by the Directorate of Archaeology and Museums.  “ Period I is dated to 2nd/1st century BC E   Period III 2nd/3rd century CE.” Among the artefacts recovered were: “terracotta plaques, pottery, uninscribed cast-copper coins, semi-precious stone beads.”

Geography

Area overview
Baruipur subdivision is a rural subdivision with moderate levels of urbanization. 31.05% of the population lives in the urban areas and 68.95% lives in the rural areas. In the southern portion of the subdivision (shown in the map alongside) there are 20 census towns. The entire district is situated in the Ganges Delta and the southern part is covered by the Baruipur-Jaynagar Plain.

Note: The map alongside presents some of the notable locations in the subdivision. All places marked in the map are linked in the larger full screen map.

Location

Demographics
According to the 2011 Census of India, Tilpi  had a total population of 13,350, of which 6,853 (51%) were males and 6,507 (49%) were females. There were 2,635 persons in the age range of 0 to 6 years. The total number of literate persons in Tilpi was 7,011 (65.43% of the population over 6 years).

Transport
Gocharan-Dhosa Road links Tilpi to the State Highway 1.

Gocharan railway station is located nearby.

Healthcare
Padmerhat Rural Hospital, with 30 beds, at Padmerhat, is the major government medical facility in the Jaynagar I CD block.

References

External links

Villages in South 24 Parganas district
Neighbourhoods in Jaynagar Majilpur